Onslaught may refer to:

Characters
 Onslaught (Marvel Comics), a Marvel Comics supervillain
 Onslaught (DC Comics), a DC Comics team of Quraci terrorists
 Onslaught (Transformers), the leader of the Combaticons in the Transformers series

Games
 Onslaught (Magic: The Gathering), an expansion to the Magic: The Gathering collectible card game
 Onslaught, a gametype in the first-person shooter computer game Unreal Tournament 2004
 Onslaught (1989 video game), a 1989 Amiga beat'em up computer game
 Onslaught (2009 video game), a 2009 Wii first-person shooter video game
 A co-op mode in the video game Battlefield: Bad Company 2

Other
 Onslaught (band), a British thrash metal band
 Onslaught (novel), a 2002 science fiction novel by David Sherman and Dan Cragg
 Onslaught (Dove), a short film/advertisement made by Dove for their Campaign for Real Beauty